German submarine U-1228 was a Type IXC/40 U-boat built for Nazi Germany's Kriegsmarine during World War II.

Design
German Type IXC/40 submarines were slightly larger than the original Type IXCs. U-1228 had a displacement of  when at the surface and  while submerged. She had two shafts and two  propellers.

U-1228 was fitted with six  torpedo tubes (four fitted at the bow and two at the stern), 22 torpedoes, one  SK C/32 naval gun, 180 rounds, and a  Flak M42 as well as two twin  C/30 anti-aircraft guns. The boat had a complement of forty-eight.

Service history
U-1228 was ordered on 14 October 1941 from Deutsche Werft in Hamburg-Finkenwerder under the yard number 391. Her keel was laid down on 16 February 1943 and the U-boat was launched on 2 October. About three months later she was commissioned into service under the command of Oberleutnant zur See Friedrich-Wilhelm Marienfeld (Crew X/38) in the 31st U-boat Flotilla on 22 December 1943.

After work-up for deployment, U-1228 transferred to the 2nd U-boat Flotilla and left Kiel for the West Atlantic on 5 September 1944 for her first and only patrol. Stopping briefly in Bergen, Norway, for replenishment, she experienced engine troubles in the Norwegian Sea and had to return to port. She set off again on 12 October from Bergen and operated south of Nova Scotia sinking one warship, .

She returned to Bergen on 28 December 1944 and continued her journey to Flensburg the same day. On 17 January 1945, she arrived in Wesermünde where she spent the next two months in the yard. U-1228 set out again on 1 April 1945 for operations in the West Atlantic. After the surrender of Germany, the U-boat made for the closest Allied port and surrendered to US forces in Portsmouth, New Hampshire on 17 May 1945.

Summary of raiding history

References

Notes

Citations

Bibliography

World War II submarines of Germany
German Type IX submarines
1943 ships
U-boats commissioned in 1943
Ships built in Hamburg
U-boats sunk in 1946
Maritime incidents in 1946
U-boats sunk by US submarines
Ships sunk as targets